The O-Jolle was a sailing event on the Sailing at the 1936 Summer Olympics program in Firth of Kiel. Seven races were scheduled. 28 sailors, on 25 boats, from 25 nations competed.

Results 

DNF = Did Not Finish, DSQ = Disqualified
 = Male,  = Female

Daily standings

Conditions at the Inner Course 
All starts were scheduled for 10:30.

Notes

References 
 
 

 

O-Jolle
O-Jolle